The Candoshi people are an indigenous group of the Peruvian Amazon, primarily living in the province of Datem del Marañón, Loreto Region, along the Huitoyacu, Rimachi, Pastaza, Nucuray, and Manchari Rivers. There population is estimated to be 3,000 people.

References

Indigenous peoples in Peru